Charles Hines Foster (December 23, 1893 – December 17, 1943) was an American racewalker. He competed in the men's 10 kilometres walk at the 1924 Summer Olympics.

References

External links
 

1893 births
1943 deaths
Athletes (track and field) at the 1924 Summer Olympics
American male racewalkers
Olympic track and field athletes of the United States
People from Port Colborne
Canadian emigrants to the United States
Track and field athletes from Detroit
Track and field athletes from Michigan